The Eight Grand Ministries, also called Badabu (pinyin: bā dà bù), refer to the former buildings of the State Council and its ministries of the Manchukuo government. They still exist almost intact on and around Xinmin Avenue of Changchun, Jilin Province, China, are used by Jilin University's Medical School and others, and have recently become one of the highlights of Changchun's sightseeing, because of their impressive, combined Chinese, Japanese and Manchurian architecture.

Overview

The Eight Ministries originally referred to the eight ministerial-level administrative agencies under the State Council of Manchukuo. They were the following ministries:
 Ministry of Public Safety
 Ministry of Justice
 Ministry of Economy
 Ministry of Communications
 Ministry of Agriculture
 Ministry of Culture and Education
 Ministry of Foreign Affairs 
 Ministry of Civil Affairs. 

According to the "Great New Hsinking City Plan", the Manchukuo government arranged most of the office buildings of its ruling institutions on Shuntian Avenue in Hsinking City (now Xinmin Avenue in Chaoyang District, Changchun City, Jilin Province, China) and its surrounding area. The office buildings were located on both sides of the avenue of 1,500 meters long and 60 meters wide (with a garden strip in the center). The northern end of this area was the construction site of the new Imperial Palace of Manchuria (the future Puyi's palace), and on both sides of the avenue to the south were the office buildings of the State Council of Manchuria and various government ministries. At the southern end, there was a office building of other general government agencies, next to Anmin Square (now Xinmin Square). 

This large-scale office building complex was constructed in the 1930s. All buildings had the oriental characteristics, with the traditional Chinese and Japanese style roofs, and were called the "Manchurian buildings". They were all on spacious sites, in an elegant and quiet environment, in magnificent shapes, and each with its own unique characteristics. They were surrounded by large green trees and constituted a representative block of the Garden City style of the "National Capital Construction" Plan of Manchuria. This long strip of scenic area was commonly called the "Eight Grand Ministries" by the locals, and is now listed as a National Key Scenic Area.

The new palace began construction at the northern end of the central axis in September 1938. After the outbreak of the Pacific War, its construction was suspended due to the financial constraints. By 1945, only the basement part of the main palace had been completed. In 1953, on this base was built a palace-like building of 30,000 square meters, which was used as Jilin University's Geology School (now the Changchun Geological Museum on Jilin University's Chaoyang Campus). The front of the future palace was originally planned as Shuntian Square, covering an area of 180,000 square meters, which was transformed into the green, grassy Cultural Square in 1996.

The historical buildings of the "Eight Ministries" and their neighborhood are basically intact. In June 2012, Xinmin Avenue was selected as a Historically and Culturally Famous Street of China. In March 2013, the former buildings of the State Council, the Ministry of Military, the Ministry of Justice, the Ministry of Economy, the Ministry of Communications, the Ministry of Foreign Affairs, the Ministry of Civil Affairrs and Judiciary Building (Supreme Court, Hsinking District Court and Prosecutor's Office) were collectively designated as a Major Historical and Cultural Site Protected at the National Level.

The following table shows the photos, then and now, and other information of the former buildings of the "Eight Grand Ministries" and related agencies of the Manchukuo government.

See also 
 Manchukuo State Council
 Manchukuo
 Museum of the Imperial Palace of Manchukuo

References

External links 
 

Buildings in Manchukuo
Politics of Manchukuo
Tourist attractions in Changchun 
Buildings and structures in Changchun
Major National Historical and Cultural Sites in Jilin